Hofireh is a village in Ahvaz County, Khuzestan Province, Iran.

Hofireh or Hofeyreh may also refer to:

 Hofireh-ye Hajji Barbeyn, Ahvaz County, Khuzestan Province, Iran
 Hofireh-ye Olya, Ramshir County, Khuzestan Province, Iran
 Hofeyreh, alternate name of Khoveyseh, Ahvaz